Fariha Pervez is a Pakistani pop singer-songwriter, and a music producer.

She is specially known for the rendition of various popular and famous Ghazals. She started her career anchoring and acting from a very young age on PTV (Pakistan Television Corporation). She also co-hosted a popular children's music program "Aangan Aangan Taray". After the release of her debut album "Nice & Naughty", her song "Patang Baaz Sajna" (a.k.a. Bo Kata song) became an instant hit and from there, her musical career took off and she decided to focus solely on singing.

Early life 
Fariha Pervez was born in Lahore, Pakistan on 2 February 1974. She claims to have inherited her singing talent from her father.
In 1995, Pervez joined Master Feroze Gill for classical training in music. She belongs to an artist family of Pakistani showbiz. She is the only sister of two brothers and likes to spend her spare time with her family.

Career 
Fariha Pervez started her career with anchoring and acting in the early 90s but then she switched over to music in mid 90s. She began her career as an actress and worked in quite a few drama serials including the famous kids drama Ainak Wala Jin.

Pervez released her first music album in 1996, titled Nice & Naughty. She has released seven albums so far and has had many hit songs from each album. During her musical career, she has sung for Pakistani films such as Chief Sahib (1996), Sailab, Ghunghat, Sangam, Inteha & Moosa Khan (2001 film).

In her early days as a singer, Fariha Pervez also appeared in the famous PTV programmes which consisted of Amir Khusrau's mystic songs by the name of Woh Bahar Aayi and Chilmann. Fariha Pervez sang alongside her cousin Arifa Siddiqui, Irum Hassan, Seemi Zaidi, Shabnam Majeed and Saira Naseem. Other than that, Fariha Pervez has sung numerous drama title songs and singles as well as several songs in the popular PTV "Virsa" musical program a series of traditional musical program, produced by Mian Yousuf Salahuddin for PTV.

Passion (2005) 
6th album Passion was released in 2005 under Sadaf Stereo. This album contained 12 songs. The video of "Yaad Piya Ki Aaye" (Tribute to Ustad Bade Ghulam Ali Khan) was the first one directed by Jawad Bashir. This 'Thumri' also received the award for the Best Ballad in the first "The Musik Awards" (TMA).

Abhi Abhi (2010)
Fariha Pervez's 7th album Abhi Abhi was released under Sadaf Stereo record label. The album was officially launched five years after the release of her 6th music album on 12 November 2010.

Awards

References

1974 births
Living people
Pakistani pop singers
Pakistani pop
20th-century Pakistani women singers
Pakistani singers by genre
Urdu-language singers
Pakistani classical singers
Punjabi-language singers
Pakistani women singers
Singers from Lahore
Punjabi people
Pakistani women singer-songwriters
PTV Award winners
21st-century Pakistani women singers